Godiva is the name of three DC Comics characters. One is a superhero while the other two are supervillains.

Publication history
Godiva first appeared in Super Friends #7 and was created by E. Nelson Bridwell.

Fictional character biography
Dorcas Leigh is a beautiful socialite from the United Kingdom with the power to control her hair's movement. Her first mission was to assist the Elongated Man in dismantling a bomb near London. Later on, she helped Wonder Woman find the Queen Bee. She later helps Jack O'Lantern in the Crisis on Infinite Earths and assists Superman in a confrontation with Toyman.

Around this time she is part of a team of Guardians protecting Paris, France from an attacking force of Apellaxians. A nearby reporter states it is one of the largest alien groups spotted so far in the invasion.

Much later, along with other Global Guardians, she was brainwashed by the Bialyan dictactor Queen Bee, who fools the team into thinking she was going to sponsor them as heroes. While brainwashed, she and her team help the Justice League Europe battle a giant alien robot. This, unknown to the heroes, was part of a plan to increase the Guardian's standing in the eyes of the public. The robot manages to tangle up Godiva's hair with an extending arm. Metamorpho shape-shifts into scissors and cuts the arm. Godiva stresses her hair is her life and to not approach her with scissors again. Later, she and the Olympian, a future romantic interest, use her hair to help stop the now-damaged robot from falling on nearby people, who were too enthralled with the Guardians to notice the battle.

Sumaan Harvajarti, the brother of the man Queen Bee deposed, makes a move to take control of Bialya. Several fired members of the League had infiltrated the country and were confronting the Guardians. An accident has slain Little Mermaid, which the League is blamed for. Other League members arrive to quell an international incident. Sumaan destroys the Queen's brainwashing facilities, killing many innocent citizens. Ice manages to save most of the Guardians, the League and some innocent civilians. The brainwashed members regain their right minds. Jack O'Lantern seemingly dies but he was an unknown impostor to the group. The form of Doctor Mist was ravaged but he was a robot duplicate. Godiva herself suffers lacerations but is mobile right after the blast.

The Queen herself is shot to death by Sumaan, who takes control of the country.

After the events of Bialya, the Guardians drift apart. Fain Y'onia attacks her and the Olympian in London, England. This particular battle ends in his retreat, but not before he wounds her, apparently with the end cause of the loss of her powers because an explosion burnt her hair right off and knocked her out.

The struggle against and defeat of Fain takes the lives of Godiva's friends Bushmaster and Thunderlord, with Wild Huntsman missing in action, while putting the seer Tuatara from New Zealand into a coma.

In Post-Infinite Crisis, in JSA Classified #19-20 (Jan-Feb. 2007), after the events with Fain Y'onia, Godiva still had her "super hair". It was also revealed that she had become a victim of metahuman organ stealing. Her hair had been surgically removed from her scalp leaving her bald, powerless, and under the care of Doctor Klyburn and her medical staff at S.T.A.R. Laboratories. The hair had been removed under the directive of a mentally disturbed Delores Winters at her exclusive spa/clinic, and had been transplanted into the scalp of a young female pop star wanting to be something "special".

In The New 52 rebooted DC's continuity, Godiva's alter-ego has been adjusted to Dora Leigh. Godiva is one of the members of the relaunched Justice League International, with her hair apparently restored in the wake of Flashpoint. She is appointed to the team by UN director Andre Briggs, who uses her to win the favor of a high-ranking British politician. Upon joining the League, Godiva begins to flirt with Booster Gold.

Powers and abilities
 Godiva has prehensile hair.
 Her hair can also perform small, delicate actions, such as picking a lock.
 Godiva doesn't use her hair to lift things, but the psionic field in her altered hair-cells, causing mutual attraction in across the gaps between strands, allowing her to lift weights up to 2 tons.

Other characters named Godiva

Teen Titans villain
Godiva is a foe of the Titans who first appeared in The New Teen Titans vol. 2 Annual #3 (1988). This Godiva is vain beauty who claims to be the offspring of a Chinese prince and an African princess, Godiva is a mercenary who works in espionage, assassination and theft. Her base of operations is in the Swiss Alps.

The New Teen Titans first encountered Godiva in France after she had kidnapped John and Cherie Chase, Danny Chase's parents. The Chases had information on a spy satellite that Godiva was planning to steal and sell to the highest bidder. Danny eventually saved the Titans, but Godiva escaped. As a result of Danny's actions and his powers, he was allowed to stay with the Titans.

Godiva clashed with the Titans a second time, assassinating a British spy who was taking refuge at a secret agent retirement home. Godiva got away yet again by distracting the Titans with an explosion that appeared to kill Nightwing and by dropping the British agent to his death.

Superman/Batman villain
Another Godiva appeared in Superman/Batman #20 as a member of an alternate universe team of villains called the Axis of Evil. She willingly chooses to go into battle unclothed. This Godiva had the ability to fascinate anybody and hold them to her will, regardless of sexual orientation.

Other versions

Flashpoint
In the alternate timeline of the Flashpoint event, Godiva and the heroes are running from the Amazons, until Godiva is rescued by Canterbury Cricket. The heroes then hide in the bushes and learn Canterbury Cricket's origins, until the Amazons breach their hideout. During this same period, Godiva joins the Grifter's Resistance. After an ambush by the Furies, Godiva rescue Grifter from the Furies member Vixen. While the Resistance head to Westminster, Resistance member Miss Hyde betrays them and contacts the Furies. However, Miss Hyde regains control of the body and fights the Amazons, allowing Godiva and the Resistance to gain the upper hand.

In other media
 Godiva appears in Justice League: The Flashpoint Paradox as part of the resistance in London.

References

External links
 Godiva I at DC Comics Wiki
 Godiva II at DC Comics Wiki

Articles about multiple fictional characters
Comics characters introduced in 1977
Comics characters introduced in 1988
DC Comics female superheroes
DC Comics characters with superhuman strength
DC Comics metahumans
British superheroes
Fictional socialites
Fictional characters who can stretch themselves